Sincoraea is a genus of flowering plant in the family Bromeliaceae, native to eastern Brazil (the states of Bahia and Minas Gerais). The genus was erected by Ernst Ule in 1908.

Species
, Plants of the World Online accepted the following species:

References

External links

Bromelioideae
Bromeliaceae genera